Tian Shan Pai or Tianshan Pai may refer to:

 Mount Heaven Sect, a fictional martial arts school featured in wuxia fiction
 Tien Shan Pai, a martial arts school unrelated to the fictional one